The End of a Mystery is a 2003 Spanish-Italian drama film directed by Miguel Hermoso. The screenplay was written by Fernando Marías, who adapted his own 1991 novel La luz prodigiosa.

Cast

Production 
A Spanish/Italian co-production, the film was produced by Azalea PC, Canal Sur Televisión and Surf Films, and it had the participation of Vía Digital and FORTA.

Release 
The film was theatrically released on 31 January 2003.

Accolades 

|-
| align = "center" | 2003 || 25th Moscow International Film Festival || colspan = "2" | Golden St. George ||  || align = "center" | 
|-
| align = "center" rowspan = "4" | 2004 || rowspan = "4" | 18th Goya Awards || Best Adapted Screenplay || Fernando Marías ||  || rowspan = "4" | 
|-
| Best Actor || Alfredo Landa ||  
|-
| Best Supporting Actor || José Luis Gómez || 
|-
| Best Art Direction || Félix Murcia || 
|}

See also 
 List of Spanish films of 2003
 List of Italian films of 2003

References
Citations

Bibliography

External links
 

2003 films
2003 drama films
Spanish drama films
Italian drama films
2000s Spanish-language films
Films scored by Ennio Morricone
Films based on Spanish novels
2000s Spanish films